Manfred Groh (December 23, 1948) is a German CDU politician.

Life and profession
Groh was born in Karlsruhe. After completing his initial education, he trained as a local administrator for the area of Baden-Württemberg. In 1970, he completed his education with a Diplom-Finanzwirts (FH) (Finance diploma). He was subsequently active in various state authorities. From 1994 until 2000, he was a Prokurist (authorized officer) in the state-owned parking company (Parkraumgesellschaft).

Political activities
In 1999, Manfred Groh was elected to the Karlsruhe municipal council (Gemeinerat) and served for a year. He was also on the board of the CDU Karlsruhe as well as a member of the Region Mittlerer Oberrhein associated assembly (Verbandsversammlung) since 1999. In 2005, he became chairman of the CDU faction in this assembly. From 2000 until 2006 he was the provost of the economy and finance department of the city of Karlsruhe. He was elected to the Landtag of Baden-Württemberg during the elections of 2006 and 2011. He currently represents the Landtagswahlkreis Karlsruhe I.

Family and private life
Manfred Groh is Roman Catholic. He was married in 1971 and has one daughter.

References

External links 

 Website of Manfred Groh
  CDU Landtagsfraktion Profile Website
 Information about Manfred Groh in Stadtwiki Karlsruhe

Christian Democratic Union of Germany politicians
Members of the Landtag of Baden-Württemberg
1948 births
21st-century German politicians
Living people